Melvin M. Hirsch (July 31, 1921 – December 1968) was an American professional basketball player. He played for the Boston Celtics of the Basketball Association of America (BAA), which would later become the National Basketball Association (NBA), for 13 games in the 1946–47 season. At 5 feet 6 inches tall, he was the shortest player in NBA history until Muggsy Bogues more than 40 years later. He is the third shortest NBA player of all time, after Bogues and Earl Boykins.

A stand-out player at Brooklyn College, Hirsch graduated in 1943 and served in the US Army Air Corps as a Navigator on C-47 aircraft in the 13th Troop Carrier Squadron in the South Pacific. He played on the squadron's officer's basketball team.

Hirsch died in December 1968, aged 47, from leukemia.

BAA career statistics

Regular season

References

External links

1921 births
1968 deaths
American men's basketball players
Basketball players from New York (state)
Boston Celtics players
Brooklyn Bulldogs men's basketball players
Deaths from leukemia
Guards (basketball)
Jewish men's basketball players
United States Army Air Forces personnel of World War II